Jetour (捷途) is a brand launched in 2018 by Chery under Chery Commercial Vehicle. The Chinese name of the brand is pronounced "Jietu", best translated as "Victory Road". It is a budget brand of Chery for crossovers and SUVs. The entire Jetour product range would also be no smaller than midsize segments, with options for 5, 6, or 7-seat configurations, while offering Internal combustion engine, fully electric, plug-in hybrid and possibly hydrogen powertrains.

History
The Jetour brand was launched on January 22, 2018. During the brand launch, the original Jetour X70 crossover SUV was also introduced, riding on a new chassis called the iPeL, or intelligent platform of e-network and lightweight. Later in April during the 2018 Beijing Auto Show, Jetour introduced the Jetour X Electric Concept Car, which previewed the Jetour X90 crossover SUV.

In April 2023, during the 2023 Manila International Auto Show, the Jetour brand was launched for the Philippines market.

Products
Jetour Ice Cream
Jetour Dasheng/Dashing
Jetour X70
Jetour X70S	
Jetour X70 Coupe
Jetour X70 Plus	
Jetour X90
Jetour X90 Plus
Jetour X95
Jetour Traveller (T-1)

References

External links
 Official site

Vehicle manufacturing companies established in 2018
Chery
2018 establishments in China
Cars of China
Chinese brands